The capture of HMS Epervier  was a naval action fought off the coast of Florida near Cape Canaveral on 28 April 1814, between the United States ship-rigged sloop-of-war , commanded by Master Commandant Lewis Warrington, and the British   under Commander Richard Wales. The Americans captured the British vessel after a one-sided cannonade, but the British merchant convoy escaped.

Prelude
USS Peacock was one of a class of three heavy sloops-of-war designed by William Doughty, and was named after the victory the previous year over the Royal Navy brig . Peacock sortied from New York on 12 March 1814 and, having eluded the British blockade, delivered some stores to St. Marys, Georgia. Peacock was then supposed to rendezvous with the frigate , but President had been unable to break out of New York. While waiting for President to appear, Warrington cruised around the Bahamas, hoping to intercept British merchant ships sailing from Jamaica.

Early on the morning of 28 April, several sail were sighted to windward. They belonged to a small convoy that had sailed from Havana on 23 April, escorted by Epervier. When the convoy sighted Peacock the merchant ships made all sail to escape, while Epervier prepared to engage.

The British vessel was more lightly armed than the American. Epervier carried sixteen 32-pounder carronades and two 18-pounder carronades as bow chasers. Peacock carried twenty 32-pounder carronades and two 12-pounder guns. The ratio of the vessels' broadsides was 256 pounds to 320.

Battle
As the two vessels made toward each other, the wind shifted to the southward, giving neither Peacock nor Epervier the advantage of the windward position. At about 10:20 in the morning, both ships fired their starboard broadsides on opposite tacks, aiming high to disable their opponent's rigging. Both vessels received damage aloft, after which Epervier turned downwind and engaged Peacock on a parallel course.

Peacock directed her fire against Eperviers hull with great effect. The British fire fell away rapidly, and Epervier probably scored no hits after the first broadside from the port battery. Commander Wales summoned boarding parties to muster, intending to board and capture Peacock, but his crew refused. At 11:05, Epervier struck her colours. Epervier had eight men killed and 15 wounded (about 20 percent of the crew.)

Aftermath
The Americans repaired the damage to Peacocks rigging within an hour. Peacocks first lieutenant took charge of the prize and succeeded in preventing it from sinking; the prize crew had the brig ready to sail by nightfall. Epervier was found to be carrying $118,000 in specie, which was private rather than Government property.

The next day, The Americans sighted two British frigates. Peacock successfully decoyed them away from Epervier and also herself escaped, with the result that both vessels reached Savannah, Georgia, a few days later. The Americans repaired Epervier and took her into the United States Navy as USS Epervier. Warrington set out again in Peacock and made a successful raiding cruise in British waters, capturing 14 merchant vessels.

Results
The victory of Peacock over Epervier was one of the most one-sided of the War of 1812, even though the two opposing vessels were not grossly disparate in strength. It was stated that although Peacocks fire had dismounted some of Eperviers carronades, more of them fell from their mounts when they were fired. Wales had carried out little of the gunnery practice that would have revealed defects in the guns or carriages before it was too late to remedy them. Wales had also reported disaffection and unrest among his crew and, unusually for the Royal Navy in the War of 1812, they failed in their duty to fight to their utmost. The court martial (on 20 January 1815) revealed that Epervier had the worst crew of any vessel on her station. In particular, her crew consisted mostly of invalids from the hospital.

Post script
On 21 October 1814, Congress passed a resolution that in honour of their capture of Epervier, each of Peacocks officers would receive a silver medal and each of her midshipmen would receive a sword.

Citations

References

External links
 

Epervier
April 1814 events